Ornativalva sattleri is a moth of the family Gelechiidae. It was described by Hou-Hun Li and Zhe-Min Zheng in 1995. It is found in Xinjiang, China.

The wingspan is 9.5–10 mm.

Etymology
The species is named for Dr. K．Sattler of the Natural History Museum in London.

References

Moths described in 1995
Ornativalva